Xenothictis noctiflua is a species of moth of the family Tortricidae. It is found on Vanuatu in the South Pacific Ocean.

References

	

Moths described in 1961
Archipini